The New Groove: The Blue Note Remix Project is a 1996 Blue Note Records remix-compilation, released on that label. The AllMusic reviewer wrote: "almost all of the tracks work well, pointing out the direct lines connecting the groovy hipness of jazz with the best of modern hip-hop".

Track listing
"Kofi" - Donald Byrd remixed by The Angel
"Hummin'" - Cannonball Adderley remixed by Large Professor
Living for the City" - Noel Pointer remixed by DJ Smash
"Listen Here" - Gene Harris remixed by Guru
"Friends and Strangers" - Ronnie Laws remixed by The LG Experience
"Down Here on the Ground" - Grant Green remixed by The Ummah
"Summer Song" - Ronnie Foster remixed by Diamond D
"Move Your Hand" - Dr. Lonnie Smith remixed by Michael Franti
"Sophisticated Hippie" -Horace Silver remixed by 	Easy Mo Bee
"Montara" - Bobby Hutcherson remixed by The Roots
"Mixed Feelings" [The New Groove] - Jacky Terrasson remixed by The Angel

References

1996 remix albums
Albums produced by Diamond D
Albums produced by Easy Mo Bee
Albums produced by Guru
Albums produced by Large Professor
Blue Note Records remix albums
Jazz remix albums
Tribute albums